The Chardon Courthouse Square District is located in Chardon, Ohio, and contains the Geauga County Courthouse as well as the several buildings serving as the courthouse annexes. The district was added to the National Register on 1974-10-18.

The Chardon Courthouses Square District is a group of late 19th century buildings, most in a High Victorian Italianate Style.  The district covers the public green, the county courthouse and two blocks of commercial buildings on the west side of the public green.  The green is divided into a north unit and a south unit with the Geauga County Courthouse in the north unit.

References

External links

Geography of Geauga County, Ohio
Historic districts on the National Register of Historic Places in Ohio
Courthouse Square District
Squares in Ohio
National Register of Historic Places in Geauga County, Ohio
Courthouses on the National Register of Historic Places in Ohio